Cross Roads is an unincorporated community in St. Francois County, in the U.S. state of Missouri.

History
A post office called Cross Roads was established in 1858, and remained in operation until 1862. The community was named for a road junction near the town site.

References

Unincorporated communities in St. Francois  County, Missouri
Unincorporated communities in Missouri